3400 International Drive (also known as Intelsat Headquarters) is an office complex in the North Cleveland Park neighborhood of Washington, D.C. by the Van Ness metro station. 

Known for its futuristic and high-tech architecture, it was designed by the Australian architect John Andrews and built by Gilbane Building Company to be the U.S. headquarters of the International Telecommunications Satellite Organization (Intelsat).

It building was designated as a landmark in the DC Inventory of Historic Sites by the Historic Preservation Review Board in April 2019.

Since 2019, the building has housed the D.C. location of Whittle School & Studios, a private, for-profit "global school" that serves students ages 3–18. In July 2022, the school announced that the D.C. location will close.

Background 
The International Telecommunications Satellite Organization (INTELSAT), founded in 1964 to ensure that satellite communications capabilities were equally available to all countries, was initially headquartered in a cramped leased space at L’Enfant Plaza.

The organization began seeking a new Washington, D.C., headquarters in 1977. Ultimately, they held a competition through the International Union of Architects to design a new energy-efficient building in which at least 70% of the office space had natural light and a view of the outside. The 1979 competition drew bids from nearly 100 firms from 23 countries.

Structure
The design competition and contract were won by Australian architect John Andrews. 

Ground was broken on the project on July 20, 1982, in a rather unusual manner. Using a network of four satellites and five earth stations, a signal was radioed around the world two times before it triggered a pre-set explosion at the building site. The complex was built in two phases: Phase I was completed in 1984, Phase II in 1988. 

Intelsat's director general and deputy embezzled $5 million during design and construction.

The complex consists of 14 interconnected rectangular "pods" clustered in groups of four around taller glass and stainless steel atria. The circular stairwells external to the pods are constructed of glass bricks and concrete. 

Unusual for the time, but in line with the nascent environmental aesthetic, the design incorporated energy efficiency such as the use of tinted-glass sunscreens and the open-air atria that admit sunlight while reflecting direct sun. Also, the complex incorporates interior and exterior water features for cooling and terraced roof gardens to complement the large trees preserved by the site plan. INTELSAT's design, one of the first “green buildings” in Washington, D.C., became an important model for environmentally conscious and energy saving architecture.

Intelsat was the initial occupant, but after its privatization in 1999 and its later mergers with PanAmSat, COMSAT and parts of Loral, its continued presence at the site has been uncertain. This is partially as it is looking for a smaller complex. The embassies of Cameroon, Honduras, and Monaco are currently housed in the building. Other occupants have included the embassies of Belize, Botswana, and Swaziland and WJLA Channel 7.

Reception

Andrews said his design expressed "a spirit of openness, of optimism, of faith in cooperation between peoples and groups of people, and the use of modern technology." However, since its construction, reception has been mixed. Some consider it "a Connecticut Avenue landmark and a must-see for futurists touring the nation's capital" because of its unique high-tech design and energy efficiency. Early in its existence, it was noted as being a positive repudiation of architectural conservatism, however, its style was not duplicated and therefore it stands out from the surrounding city.

Other critics also note that it does not interact well with the surrounding buildings and add that it can be difficult for visitors to find the entrance.  it had been studied by the Historic Preservation Section of the D.C. Office of Planning as a potential landmark of Modern architecture, but a 2011 architectural-historical review of the area as part of the University of the District of Columbia's student center construction planning found that Intelsat was not old enough for landmark status and was a "visual shock" to the neighborhood, given its arguably inappropriate design and sitting for an urban area. The review did indicate that this opinion could change as the building aged further.

And it did. In January 2017 the Intelsat Headquarters was nominated for historic designation by the DC Preservation League (DCPL). The INTELSAT Headquarters building was nominated under DC Criterion A for important historical events, because of its associated with telecommunication achievements. It also falls under Criterion B for history because it served as Intelsat's home. Due to its historical significance, it is also eligible under the National Register Criterion A for history. The building was also nominated under the District of Columbia Criterion D and the National Register Criterion C for its architecture. In addition to that, it was nominated under DC Criterion F as the work of a master architect. John Andrews' work has been recognized internationally and has had other buildings designated as historic sites.

References

Buildings and structures in Washington, D.C.
Office buildings completed in 1984
Office buildings completed in 1988
Headquarters in the United States
1984 establishments in Washington, D.C.
1988 establishments in Washington, D.C.
Intelsat
North Cleveland Park